The Escalante Desert is a geographic Great Basin region and arid desert ecoregion, in the deserts and xeric shrublands biome, located in southwestern Utah.

Geography
The Escalante Desert is northwest of Cedar City in Iron County, Utah, and extends into part of Millard County. The region spans most of Iron County, which annually has  rainfall and  snowfall.  The Escalante region also lies primarily between State Route 56 and Route 21, as well as north and west of Interstate 15.

From the Escalante Desert region's peripheral ridges, the elevation slowly declines to Lund Flats, which has railroad tracks between Milford and Lund.

Subsidence
Near Beryl Junction are 3 fissures formed by suspected groundwater-related subsidence caused by groundwater extraction for agricultural irrigation.

References

Deserts of Utah
Great Basin deserts
Geography of Iron County, Utah
Geography of Millard County, Utah